The Beregovoye Field is a natural gas field in the northeast of Purovsky District, Yamalo-Nenets Autonomous Okrug, Russia.  The field is developed by Sibneftegaz, a joint venture of Novatek and Itera.  Sibneftegaz holds the exploration and development license for the Beregovoy license area until 2023.

History
The field was discovered in 1982 and it was named after Russian geologist Vladimir Beregovoi.  It was to be developed by Sibneftegaz, a subsidiary of Gazprom.  However, in late 1990s Gazprom lost control over Sibneftegaz and the main shareholder became Itera. The second largest shareholder became the Russian fertilizer producer Acron Group.

The field was ready for production in 2003; however, commercial production started only in 2007 after change in its ownership structure as Gazprom did not allowed produced gas to enter into the gas transportation system.  In 2006, Gazprom through its banking arm Gazprombank bought back controlling stake (51%) in Sibneftegaz from Itera and commercial production started after that.  In 2009, Itera bought Acron Group 21% stake in Sibneftegaz.

In December 2010, Novatek bought a 51% stake in Sibneftegaz from Gazprombank.

Reserves

The field is connected by  pipeline with the Zapolyarnoye–Urengoi pipeline.

References 

Natural gas fields in Russia
Industry in the Arctic
Geography of Yamalo-Nenets Autonomous Okrug